Year of the Snitch is the sixth studio album by experimental hip hop group Death Grips, released on June 22, 2018, through Third Worlds and Harvest Records.

Background
With the release of Steroids (Crouching Tiger Hidden Gabber Megamix), Death Grips announced they were "working on the new Death Grips album". The band has made apparent via social media that they had been working with ambitious collaborators for the creation of the project throughout the promotion of the album, including in-studio collaborations with Australian experimental musician Lucas Abela, New Zealand film director Andrew Adamson and Justin Chancellor, bassist for the progressive rock band Tool.

The band posted a black and white image of text reading "Year of the Snitch - new album coming soon..." on their official webpage on March 22, 2018. Death Grips shared the album artwork for Year of the Snitch on April 6, 2018. The band's imprint label Third Worlds' website was also updated with this information.

The tracklist for the album was released on April 11, through a video posted to social media and the band's YouTube channel. The video consisted of the track names being sent via SMS to the user of an iPhone through a screen recorder, while short videos played in the foreground. Accompanying the differing ringtones, screamed vocals of the band's frontman MC Ride can be heard, coming from the album's last track, "Disappointed".

Death Grips uploaded a music video for the track "Streaky" on their YouTube channel on May 5, 2018, as the album's first single, followed by the track "Black Paint" on May 15, and the music video for the third album single, "Flies", on May 22.

The band posted a short video to Instagram on May 23, featuring DJ Swamp performing on a turntable in a recording studio, with the caption stating that "the majority of Year of the Snitch features [him]".

The fourth single, "Hahaha", was uploaded by the band to their YouTube page on June 7. That same day, the album's release date was announced as June 22. A music video for the track "Dilemma" featuring Andrew Adamson was uploaded on the Death Grips YouTube channel on June 15. A sixth single, "Shitshow", was uploaded to YouTube two days later. Three days later, on June 20, the official video for "Shitshow" was released. It was directed by Zach Hill and Galen Pehrson.

Interpretations 
The band has been notorious for their invocation of infamous cult-leader Charles Manson, stemming from their sampling of his voice in their debut mixtape "Exmilitary". Prior to the album's release, the title "Year of the Snitch" was speculated to be a reference to the 69th birthday of Manson Family member-turned-key witness Linda Kasabian. This theory is supported by the album's release date on June 22, one day after Kasabian's birthday, as well as the fourth track "Linda's in Custody", which seems to allude to her role in the Tate-LeBianca murders.

Critical reception

Year of the Snitch received generally favorable reviews from critics. At Metacritic, which assigns a normalized rating out of 100 to reviews from mainstream publications, the album received an average score of 69 out of 100, based on 8 reviews. In his review for AllMusic, Rob Wacey claimed that "Not one of their releases is the same as another, and with Year of the Snitch, they continue to break boundaries and expectations. The record is another example of true experimentation with their sound along with an uncompromising work ethic and a thirst for originality." Writing for The Line of Best Fit, Steven Loftin called the band "one of the more exciting bands currently active" and described the album as "pushing every boundary around them". Ian Cohen of Pitchfork called the album "explosive" and "fun as hell", but "lacking in a clear target to give it meaning".

Christopher R. Weingarten of Rolling Stone named the song "Black Paint" as his 2018 pick for the magazine's "song of the summer" series.

Track listing
Notes

 "Hahaha" was spelled "Ha Ha Ha" in early publications before the single's release.

Personnel
 Stefan Burnett – vocals, lyrics 
 Zach Hill – drums, production, vocals on "Little Richard", lyrics
 Andy Morin – keyboards, production, lyrics

Additional personnel
 DJ Swamp – turntables
 Andrew Adamson – spoken word intro on "Dilemma"
 Justin Chancellor – bass on "Disappointed"
 Justice Yeldham – glass on “Death Grips Is Online” and “Outro”

Charts

References

2018 albums
Death Grips albums
Harvest Records albums